The Mai-Liao Power Corporation (MPC) is an independent power producer company in Taiwan. The total electricity installed capacity of the company is 1,800 MW and is produced using thermal power. The company is the subsidiary of Formosa Plastics Group.

History
MPC was founded by Formosa Plastics Corp., Nan-Ta Plastics Corp., Formosa Chemical-Fiber Corp. and Formosa Petrochemical Corp. on 12 April 1996 with an initial capital of NT$ 4 billion.

Power plants
 Mailiao Power Plant in Mailiao Township, Yunlin County

See also

 Electricity sector in Taiwan
 List of power stations in Taiwan
 List of companies of Taiwan

References

External links
 

Taiwanese companies established in 1996
Energy companies established in 1996
Formosa Plastics Group
Electric power companies of Taiwan